Bleeke Bet is a 1923 Dutch silent film directed by Alex Benno.

Cast
 Alida van Gijtenbeek - Bleeke Bet
 Jan van Dommelen - Tinus, haar man
 Beppie De Vries - Jans
 Riek Kloppenburg - Trui
 Piet Urban - Van Zanten
 Heintje Davids
 Herman Bouber - Sally Matteman
 Harry Boda - Ko Monjé
 Johan Elsensohn - Lucas
 Henriette Blazer - Meid (as Henriëtte Blazer)
 Gerardus van Weerdenburg - Hannes (as Kees van Dam)
 Kees Pruis - Eerste student
 Frans Bogaert - Tweede student
 John Timrott
 Emile Timrott

External links 
 

1923 films
Dutch black-and-white films
Films directed by Alex Benno
Dutch silent feature films